Sortilège is a French heavy metal band from Paris, regarded as a cult band of the French scene. The group ceased to exist in 1986 but reformed in 2019.

Biography
The band was formed in 1981 with Christian Augustin on vocals, Daniel Lapp on bass, Jean-Philippe (Bob) Dumont on drums and Stephane Dumont and Didier Demajean on guitars. Originally, the band's name was Bloodwave.

The following year, the quality of their repertoire and their concerts in France improved so they were hired as an opening act for Def Leppard on their tour in France. Since none of the French record labels wanted to offer them a recording contract, they signed for the Netherlands label Rave-On Records. A few months later, the band recorded an EP titled Sortilège which was successful. With this initial success, the band signed to the French record label, Madrigal. A few weeks later, the band went to Germany to record their first album Métamorphose. This was again a success, mainly in France and Germany.

With the success of Métamorphose, the band played in many international festivals and became popular in Germany, Netherlands, Switzerland, Belgium and France. Feeling that their French may harm global sales, the band decided to re-record their album Metamorphose in English. However, the English version of the record sold poorly everywhere except in Japan.

In 1986, Sortilège released their last album, Larmes de Héros. Like the previous album, it was recorded in Germany. At the same time they recorded an English version, which again sold badly. Tired of the lack of public support, and difficulties encountered in relation to record companies, Sortilège decided to split up in 1986.

The band reunited in 2019, sans guitarist Stéphane Dumont, for a festival appearance in Germany. In  April 2021, Sortilège announced their return with a new band lineup, helmed by original vocalist Christian Augustin, on their Instagram page. Later that year, the band released Phoenix, an album consisting of primarily re-recorded tracks from past albums, as well as two new songs. As of June 2021, Augustin is currently the only member remaining from the band's original lineup.

In January 2023, the band announced their new album, Apocalypso, would be released on March 3. It is the band's first album of original material in 37 years.

Other media exposure
The song "Le Cyclope De l’Etang", released in 1984 on the album Métamorphose is on the compilation album Metal Warriors (released by Ebony Records).

Christian Augustin appeared as a guest on the album by Furious Zoo. Stephane Dumont works as a sound engineer in the United States. Didier Demajean is director of a computer company, and Jean-Philippe Dumont is noticeable for his attempt to reform Sortilège in the early 2000s.

Members
Current Members
 Christian Augustin known as "Zouille" – vocals (1981-1986, 2019–present)
 Olivier Spitzer - Guitar (2021–present)
 Bruno Ramos - Guitar (2021–present)
 Sébastien Bonnet - Bass (2021–present)
 Clément Rouxel - Drums (2021–present)
Former Members
 Stéphane Dumont known as "L'Anguille" – lead guitar
 Didier Demajean known as "Dem" – rhythm guitar
 Daniel Lapp known as "Lapin" – bass
 Jean-Philippe Dumont known as "Bob Snake" – drums

Discography
1983: Sortilège
1984: Métamorphose
1984: Live Breaking Sound Festival (bootleg)
1986: Larmes de Héros
2021: Phoenix
2023: Apocalypso

References

External links 
fglmusic.com
metal.nightfall.fr
 Sortilège sur les BNR Metal Pages

French heavy metal musical groups
Musical groups established in 1981
Musical groups disestablished in 1986
Musical groups from Paris